Livin' on the Run is the second album by actor/singer/songwriter Scott Grimes.  Released in early 2005, it went on to produce two hit singles for Grimes on the Billboard top forty AC charts including one top twenty hit with "Sunset Blvd". The song remained in the top 20 for 10 weeks without climbing higher than No. 18.

History 
After 16 years between albums (his first release was the 1989 A&M album Scott Grimes), Grimes released this collection of material. Most of the songs were written years prior to the album's release. Grimes' career as an actor kept him busy with little time to pursue his first love of music. The album was recorded with L.A.-area studio musicians and would go on to become even more successful than his debut record.

Track listing

Singles
The following singles were released from the album, with the highest charting positions listed.

Album credits

Personnel
 Dawn Bailey - background vocals
 Ricardo Belled - bass guitar
 Paul Buckmaster - conductor, string arrangements, string conductor
 Randy Chortkoff -	executive producer
 Robin Dimaggio - percussion, drums
 Paul Escudero	- Executive Producer
 Tom Fletcher	- Producer, Engineer, Mixing
 Mike Glines	- Digital Editing
 Jay Gore -	Guitar (Acoustic), Guitar (Electric), Producer
 Scott Grimes -	Guitar (Acoustic), Piano, Vocals, Vocals (background), Producer
 Kent Jacobs -	Executive Producer
 Luke Miller -	Hammond organ
 Sean O'Dwyer	- Engineer
 Charles Paakkari - Engineer, Digital Editing
 Bryan Pitcher	- Art Direction, Instrumentation
 Marc Regan -	Mastering
 Kent Jacobs- Executive Producer
 Russ Regan - Executive Producer
 Colin Smith -	Graphic Design
 Edward Turner	 - Production Assistant, Instrumentation, Production Design

In popular culture
In the American Dad! episode "American Dream Factory", Steve's band (Steve is voiced by Grimes) perform "Livin' on the Run" and "Sunset Blvd".

References

External links
"Sunset Blvd." music video
Grimes & Harris Myspace page

2005 albums
Scott Grimes albums